Großmehring is a municipality in the district of Eichstätt in Bavaria in Germany.

Mayors

since 2020: Rainer Stingl
2008–2020: Ludwig Diepold (UW)
1990-2008: Horst Volkmer

References

Eichstätt (district)